Mehdi Khanlu (also Romanized as Mehdī Khānlū) is a village in Azadlu Rural District, Muran District, Germi County, Ardabil Province, Iran. At the 2006 census, its population was 40, in 6 families.

References 

Towns and villages in Germi County